Megachile saulcyi is a species of bee in the family Megachilidae. It was described by Félix Édouard Guérin-Méneville in 1845.

References

Saulcyi
Insects described in 1845